In mathematics, triality is a relationship among three vector spaces, analogous to the duality relation between dual vector spaces. Most commonly, it describes those special features of the Dynkin diagram D4 and the associated Lie group Spin(8), the double cover of 8-dimensional rotation group SO(8), arising because the group has an outer automorphism of order three. There is a geometrical version of triality, analogous to duality in projective geometry.

Of all simple Lie groups, Spin(8) has the most symmetrical Dynkin diagram, D4. The diagram has four nodes with one node located at the center, and the other three attached symmetrically. The symmetry group of the diagram is the symmetric group S3 which acts by permuting the three legs. This gives rise to an S3 group of outer automorphisms of Spin(8). This automorphism group permutes the three 8-dimensional irreducible representations of Spin(8); these being the vector representation and two chiral spin representations. These automorphisms do not project to automorphisms of SO(8). The vector representation—the natural action of SO(8) (hence Spin(8)) on —consists over the real numbers of Euclidean 8-vectors and is generally known as the "defining module", while the chiral spin representations are also known as "half-spin representations", and all three of these are fundamental representations.

No other connected Dynkin diagram has an automorphism group of order greater than 2; for other Dn (corresponding to other even Spin groups, Spin(2n)), there is still the automorphism corresponding to switching the two half-spin representations, but these are not isomorphic to the vector representation.

Roughly speaking, symmetries of the Dynkin diagram lead to automorphisms of the Tits building associated with the group.  For special linear groups, one obtains projective duality.  For Spin(8), one finds a curious phenomenon involving 1-, 2-, and 4-dimensional subspaces of 8-dimensional space, historically known as "geometric triality".

The exceptional 3-fold symmetry of the D4 diagram also gives rise to the Steinberg group 3D4.

General formulation

A duality between two vector spaces over a field  is a non-degenerate bilinear form

Similarly, a triality between three vector spaces over a field  is a non-degenerate trilinear form

i.e., each non-zero vector in one of the three vector spaces induces a duality between the other two.

By choosing vectors  in each  on which the trilinear form evaluates to 1, we find that the three vector spaces are all isomorphic to each other, and to their duals.

The non-degeneracy condition now implies that  is a composition algebra. It follows that  has dimension 1, 2, 4 or 8. If further  and the form used to identify  with its dual is positively definite, then  is a Euclidean Hurwitz algebra, and is therefore isomorphic to R, C, H or O.

Conversely, composition algebras immediately give rise to trialities by taking each  equal to the algebra, and contracting the multiplication with the inner product on the algebra to make a trilinear form.

An alternative construction of trialities uses spinors in dimensions 1, 2, 4 and 8. The eight-dimensional case corresponds to the triality property of Spin(8).

See also 
 Triple product, may be related to the 4-dimensional triality (on quaternions)

References

 John Frank Adams (1981), Spin(8), Triality, F4 and all that, in "Superspace and supergravity", edited by Stephen Hawking and Martin Roček, Cambridge University Press, pages 435–445.
 John Frank Adams (1996), Lectures on Exceptional Lie Groups (Chicago Lectures in Mathematics), edited by Zafer Mahmud and Mamora Mimura, University of Chicago Press, .

Further reading

External links
Spinors and Trialities by John Baez
Triality with Zometool by David Richter

Lie groups
Spinors